

Mauritz Freiherr von Strachwitz (12 December 1898 – 10 December 1953) was a German general during World War II. He was a recipient of the Knight's Cross of the Iron Cross. Strachwitz surrendered to the Soviet forces in May 1945 in the Courland Pocket. He died on 10 December 1953 in Camp Asbest in the Sverdlovsk Oblast.

Awards and decorations

 Knight's Cross of the Iron Cross on 9 January 1945 as Generalleutnant and commander of the 87. Infanterie-Division

References

Citations

Bibliography

 

1898 births
1953 deaths
People from Wrocław County
People from the Province of Silesia
Barons of Germany
Lieutenant generals of the German Army (Wehrmacht)
German Army personnel of World War I
Recipients of the clasp to the Iron Cross, 1st class
Recipients of the Gold German Cross
Recipients of the Knight's Cross of the Iron Cross
German prisoners of war in World War II held by the Soviet Union
German people who died in Soviet detention
Prussian Army personnel
German Army generals of World War II